ICBM refers to an intercontinental ballistic missile. 

ICBM may also refer to:

 Institute for Chemistry and Biology of the Marine Environment, Lower Saxony, Germany
 International Consortium for Brain Mapping; terms such as ICBM152, ICBM452 refer to brain atlases
 ICBM, a 2020 computer game by Slitherine

See also
 ICBM address, derived from the name of the missile, an example of a geotag